Axel Hermann Peschel (born 2 August 1942) is a German former cyclist. His sporting career began with SC Dynamo Berlin. He competed for East Germany in the team time trial at the 1968 Summer Olympics. Peschel won the Peace Race in 1968.

His son, Uwe  Peschel, won Olympic gold in cycling at the 1992 Summer Olympics.

References

External links
 

1942 births
Living people
East German male cyclists
Olympic cyclists of East Germany
Cyclists at the 1968 Summer Olympics
Cyclists from Saxony-Anhalt
People from Anhalt-Bitterfeld
People from Bezirk Halle